is a Japanese LDP-politician.

Overviews 

Takashi was born in the Asakusa area of Taitō, Tokyo, graduated from Waseda University and was a member of the House of Representatives from 1972 to 2000, serving as postal minister in 1990 under Toshiki Kaifu, and as Minister of Home Affairs from 1995 to 1996 under Tomiichi Murayama. He served as Minister of Economy, Trade and Industry (Japan) from 1999 to 2000 under Keizo Obuchi and Yoshiro Mori, but lost his Tokyo 2nd district seat to Yoshikatsu Nakayama in the 2000 general election, forcing his resignation as a cabinet minister.

He returned to the House in the 2005 election, and served there until announcing his retirement by failing to run in the 2012 election.

External links 
 Official homepage

|-

|-

|-

|-

|-

|-

Government ministers of Japan
Members of the House of Representatives (Japan)
Waseda University alumni
1935 births
Living people
21st-century Japanese politicians